Ortaören is a village in Silifke district of Mersin Province, Turkey. It is on the state highway   which connects Silifke to Central Anatolia. The population of the village is 127 as of 2011. The name of the village ("middle ruins") refer to the fact that there are ruins around the village. Main economic activities are animal breeding and farming. The village produces olive and various fruits like citrus and grapes. Up to now, irrigation was a big problem. However, by the summer of 2012, the problem is solved and it is hoped that it will boost the agricultural production.

References

External links
Some images

Villages in Silifke District